Erzgebirgskreis is a district (Kreis) in the Free State of Saxony, Germany. It is named after the Erzgebirge ("Ore Mountains"), a mountain range in the southern part of the district which forms part of the Germany–Czech Republic border. It borders (from the west and clockwise) the districts of Vogtlandkreis and Zwickau, the urban district Chemnitz, the district Mittelsachsen and the Czech Republic.

History 
The district was established by merging the former districts of Annaberg,  Aue-Schwarzenberg, Stollberg and Mittlerer Erzgebirgskreis as part of the  district reform of August 2008.

Geography 
The district contains the western part of the Erzgebirge, which also forms the border with the Czech Republic. Several rivers that rise in the Erzgebirge flow through the district, including Zwickauer Mulde and Zschopau.

Sister districts 
The Erzgebirgskreis has partnerships with the following districts:
 Nürnberger Land, Bavaria, Germany (1990)
 Neustadt (Aisch)-Bad Windsheim, Bavaria, Germany (1990)
 Emmendingen, Baden-Württemberg, Germany (1990)
 Ansbach, Bavaria, Germany (1991)
 Kaohsiung, Taiwan (1993)
 Kalisz Pomorski, Poland (2004)

Towns and municipalities 

{|
! colspan=2 align=left width=40%|Towns
! colspan=3 align=left width=60%|Municipalities
|- valign=top
||
Annaberg-Buchholz
Aue-Bad Schlema
Ehrenfriedersdorf
Eibenstock
Elterlein
Geyer
Grünhain-Beierfeld
Johanngeorgenstadt
Jöhstadt
Lauter-Bernsbach
Lößnitz
Lugau
Marienberg
Oberwiesenthal
||
 Oelsnitz
Olbernhau
Pockau-Lengefeld
Schneeberg
Schwarzenberg
Scheibenberg
Schlettau
Stollberg
Thalheim
Thum
Wolkenstein
Zschopau
Zwönitz

||
Amtsberg
Auerbach 
Bärenstein
Bockau
Börnichen
Breitenbrunn
Burkhardtsdorf 
Crottendorf
Deutschneudorf
Drebach
Gornau
||
Gelenau
Gornsdorf 
Großolbersdorf
Großrückerswalde
Grünhainichen 
Heidersdorf 
Hohndorf 
Jahnsdorf 
Königswalde
Mildenau
Niederdorf 
||
Neukirchen 
Niederwürschnitz 
Raschau-Markersbach
Schönheide
Sehmatal
Seiffen 
Stützengrün
Tannenberg
Thermalbad Wiesenbad
Zschorlau
|}

References

External links

Official website (German)

 
Ore Mountains